Bhimora is a village and former Rajput-Kathi princely state in Chotila Taluka of Surendranagar district, Gujarat, India.

History 
The petty princely state in Jhalawar prant, comprising ten more villages, was ruled by Khachar Kathi Chieftains, offshoot of Chotila's Rajput house. Bhimora is said to have been anciently called Bhimpuri. There is a rock-cut cave located here.

Geography 
The country around Bhimora is hilly and the river Bhogavo of Limbdi rises near this.

The population according to the census of 1872 was 513 and according to that of 1881, 109 souls. In 1901 it has a combined population of 1,204, yielding a state revenue of 10,555 Rupees (1903-4, nearly all from land), paying 371 Rupees tribute, to the British and Junagadh State.

References

Sources and external links 
 Imperial Gazetteer on dsal.uchicago.edu - Kathiawar

 This article incorporates text from a publication now in the public domain: 

Villages in Jamnagar district
Princely states of Gujarat
Rajput princely states